Fadwa Garci (born 6 February 2002) is a Tunisian table tennis player. She competed in the 2020 Summer Olympics.

References

External links

2002 births
Living people
Sportspeople from Tunis
Table tennis players at the 2020 Summer Olympics
Tunisian female table tennis players
Olympic table tennis players of Tunisia
African Games competitors for Tunisia
Competitors at the 2019 African Games
African Games medalists in table tennis
21st-century Tunisian women
African Games bronze medalists for Tunisia